Pegasus 1 or I, known before launch as Pegasus A, was an American satellite which was launched in 1965 to study micrometeoroid impacts in low Earth orbit. It was the first of three Pegasus satellites to be launched. The Pegasus spacecraft were manufactured by Fairchild Hiller, and operated by NASA.

Spacecraft

Launch

Pegasus 1 was launched atop a Saturn I rocket, serial number SA-9, flying from Launch Complex 37B at the Cape Kennedy Air Force Station. The launch occurred at 14:37:03 UTC on 16 February 1965. Following launch, Pegasus 1 was given the COSPAR designation 1965-009A, while NORAD assigned it the Satellite Catalog Number 01085.

Pegasus 1 was a secondary payload of Apollo program mission AS-103, which also carried a boilerplate Apollo spacecraft BP-16. The Apollo boilerplate acted as a payload fairing for the Pegasus spacecraft, which was stored inside what would have been the Service Module of a functional spacecraft. Upon reaching orbit, the boilerplate Command and Service modules were jettisoned.

The trajectory and space-fixed velocity were very nearly as planned. The Apollo shroud separated from the Pegasus satellite about 804 seconds after lift-off and deployment of two meteoroid detection panel wings of the Pegasus satellite commenced about 1 minute later.

Operations
Pegasus 1 was operated in a low Earth orbit. Once in orbit, the panels were deployed to detect micrometeoroid impacts. Experiment results were returned to Earth by radio. The spacecraft operated until 29 August 1968, and subsequently remained in orbit until it decayed and reentered the atmosphere on 17 September 1978. Although minor malfunctions occurred in both the launch vehicle and the satellite, the mission was a success in that all objectives were met.

See also

1965 in spaceflight

References

Spacecraft launched in 1965
Spacecraft launched by Saturn rockets